Speak up may refer to:

Technology 

 Speakup, the screen reader

Entertainment 

 Speak Up! It's So Dark, a Swedish drama film
 "Speak Up", a song by Pop Etc
 "Speak Up, Francine!", an episode of the TV series Arthur

Other uses 

 SPEAK UP, a campaign from The Center to Prevent Youth Violence
 1-866-SPEAK-UP, a national hotline from The Center to Prevent Youth Violence